WHKY-TV (channel 14) is an independent television station licensed to Hickory, North Carolina, United States. It serves the northwestern corner of the Charlotte media market, a region locally referred to as "The Unifour". WHKY-TV is owned by Long Communications alongside radio station WHKY (1290 AM and translator 102.3 FM). The two stations share studios on Main Avenue SE in Hickory. WHKY-TV's primary transmitter is located on Bakers Mountain in southwestern Catawba County, with a secondary transmitter in the unincorporated area of Newell in northeastern Mecklenburg County (just northeast of the Charlotte city limits).

There is no separate website for WHKY-TV; instead, it is integrated with that of the co-owned radio station.

History
The station first signed on the air on February 14, 1968; WHKY-TV is the oldest independent station in the state of North Carolina. (Charlotte's WCTU-TV channel 36, now NBC affiliate WCNC-TV, was the first independent station in North Carolina, signing on eight months before WHKY-TV.) During the 1980s, WHKY-TV aired Major League Baseball games from the Cincinnati Reds. Also during the 1980s, the station had a secondary affiliation with NBC, carrying some programs that were preempted by the Charlotte market's primary NBC affiliate, WPCQ-TV.

For most of its first quarter-century on the air, WHKY-TV primarily targeted the Unifour. In 2002, WHKY-TV installed two new antennas: one for its digital signal and one which replaced its older analog antenna. The latter antenna's installation helped to increase WHKY-TV's analog signal coverage into the far northern corner of Mecklenburg County. As a result, the station was granted a must-carry claim, allowing it to be added to Time Warner Cable's systems in the Charlotte area; the station also began identifying as "Hickory/Charlotte" in its on-air legal identifications.

In 2004, WHKY-TV boosted its analog transmitter's power to 2 million watts. In June 2006, the station began to be carried on Dish Network and DirecTV's Charlotte area local station lineups, expanding its reach to cover two million people in North and South Carolina. The station's digital transmitter was relocated to Bakers Mountain in the fall of 2011, with its effective radiated power increasing to 950,000 watts (equivalent to 4.75 million watts in analog); the station also launched a fill-in translator, whose transmitter is located just north of Charlotte (near the Charlotte Motor Speedway).

On February 15, 2023, it was announced that WHKY-TV would be sold to Baton Rouge, Louisiana–based Family Worship Center Church, led by pastor Jimmy Swaggart, for $12 million. Long Communications would retain WHKY radio and its FM translator, as well as the WHKY call sign.

Programming
WHKY-TV's current schedule consists primarily of locally-produced religious and entertainment shows, as well as paid programming, in addition to weekday local newscasts, airing at 5:30 and 10:00 p.m. The station also airs its only acquired syndicated show, MGM Television's Personal Injury Court.

Technical information

Subchannels
The station's digital signal is multiplexed:

Previously, the second and fourth digital subchannels have been affiliated with Jewelry Television, which is shown at various times on the main channel. The network was used as a placeholder until the additions of RTV and My Family TV on those respective subchannels. On September 28, 2012, My Family TV was replaced with PBJ. In November 2012, WHKY-TV began transmitting its main channel in 720p high definition, and in 2014 the main channel began airing Jewelry Television in HD for portions of the day. On March 1, 2014, PBJ was replaced on digital subchannel 14.4 by Heartland (which originated as the broadcast incarnation of The Nashville Network in 2012). On July 1, 2014, This TV was added to the second subchannel, making WHKY the fourth station in the Charlotte market to carry it. On that same date, Retro TV was moved to the third subchannel, replacing Tuff TV. On January 5, 2021, SonLife began broadcast on subchannel 14.7, while Charge! was replaced by TBD. On July 1, 2021, Jewelry Television and Shop LC on 14.5 and 14.6 respectively were replaced with Defy TV and TrueReal.

Analog-to-digital conversion
WHKY-TV shut down its analog signal, over UHF channel 14, on February 14, 2009, three days before the original date in which full-power television stations in the United States were to transition from analog to digital broadcasts under federal mandate. The station's digital signal remained on its pre-transition UHF channel 40. Through the use of PSIP, digital television receivers display the station's virtual channel as its former UHF analog channel 14.

Out-of-market cable carriage
WHKY-TV is also available on cable in Mountain City, Tennessee, which is part of the Tri-Cities television market.

References

External links
WHKY.com - WHKY-TV official website
Charlotte.ThisTV.com - This TV Charlotte official website

HKY-TV
Independent television stations in the United States
This TV affiliates
Comet (TV network) affiliates
Charge! (TV network) affiliates
TBD (TV network) affiliates
Television channels and stations established in 1968
1968 establishments in North Carolina
Hickory, North Carolina